Mukalla is a seaport and the capital city of Yemen's largest governorate, Hadhramaut. It is the most important port in the Hadhramaut and the fifth-largest city in Yemen, with a population of approximately 500,000. The city is served by the nearby Riyan International Airport.

History 
Mukalla is not far from Cane or Qana, the ancient principal Hadrami trading post between India and Africa, with incense producing areas in its hinterland.

Mukalla was founded in 1035 as a fishing settlement. This area was part of Oman until the middle of the 11th century, and later this area became part of Yemen. After witnessing a struggle for control by the Kathiri and Qu'aiti Sultanates in the 19th and 20th centuries, it became the capital of the Qu'aiti State of Hadhramaut, and then in 1967, it became a part of South Yemen. The Qu'aiti Sultanate was part of the Eastern Aden Protectorate until that merger, and a British Resident Advisor was stationed at Mukalla. The other major cities of the Sultanate were Ash-Shihr and Shibam.

Captain Haines, a British officer who surveyed Yemen in the 1830s, described Mukalla as a town of 4500 inhabitants with a significant trade in slaves. British explorers Theodore Bent and Mabel Bent used Mukalla several times in the 1890s to enter and exit the Wadi Hadhramaut:  “Our starting-point for the interior was Makalla, which is 230 miles from Aden, and is the only spot between Aden and Maskat which has any pretensions to the name of port. The name itself means 'harbour'… Here we were deposited in December 1893 by a chance steamer, one which had been chartered and on which for a consideration we were allowed to take passage. I took turns with the captain to sleep in his cabin, but there was nothing but the deck for the others.” In 1934, British traveler and explorer Freya Stark began her journey into the hinterland of the Hadhramaut from Mukalla, and her stay in that city is recorded in her book, The Southern Gates of Arabia.

Yemeni Civil War 
During the Yemeni Civil War, on April 2, 2015, Al-Qaida in the Arabian Peninsula (AQAP) stormed the central prison, freeing hundreds of prisoners including two senior AQAP commanders. They attacked the central bank and seized 17 billion Yemeni riyals and 1 million U.S. dollars before taking control of the presidential palace in the city. It was reported the entire city was under their control and they plan to establish an Islamic emirate in the wider Hadramaut region. Mukalla became AQAP's headquarters, and the capital of their Emirate in Yemen after their takeover.

In April 2015 Nasser bin Ali al-Ansi was killed in a US drone strike in the city, the SITE Intelligence Group said, citing media reports.

On 3 November 2015, Cyclone Chapala struck the city and destroyed the city's waterfront.

In 23 of March, a US airstrike hit an AQAP training camp, killing at least 50 people. Some days later, AQAP held a major rally in the city, against the US and their airstrikes. In April 2016, is reported that AQAP bounds at last 1,000 of its fighters inside the Mukalla only, with their taxes profit in the city to be from 2, to higher than 5 million U.S. dollars per day.

In the middle of April 2016, Al Qaeda in the Arabian Peninsula was consolidating its control in Mukalla and took over control of Mukalla's airport from forces affiliated with the pro-Ansar al Sharia Hadhrami Domestic Council, while also evacuating and planting explosives around nearby al Dhaba oil port. AQAP also arrested seven Yemeni fighters from a camp north of Mukalla in Wadi Hadramawt, where the UAE is reportedly training forces for operations against AQAP. AQAP is also redistributing property from northern landowners to local tribal leaders in an effort to shore up support, according to reports. The UAE, a core member of the Saudi-led coalition, recently led an operation to recapture AQAP-held al Hawta in Lahij governorate, amid reports the country is seeking U.S. assistance for an expanded counter-terrorism campaign in Yemen.

Recapture from Al Qaeda 

Mukalla was recaptured from Al Qaeda on 25 of April, 2016 after United Arab Emirates Armed Forces led an assault with the support of Southern Transitional Council forces and expelled them from the city.

The UAE has established a primary base of operations against AQAP in the liberated city. The special operations base has enabled the CIA and the Joint Special Operations Command (JSOC) to target AQAP's strongest cells in Yemen and allowed for an enhanced UAE-US cooperation against AQAP.

On 15 May 2016, a suicide attack was carried out in the city by Islamic State of Iraq and the Levant. The attack targeted a police base, killing at least 25 police recruits and wounding at least 54 others.

After the liberation of Mukalla, Major-General Faraj Al-Bahsani, governor of the Hadramut region, said that they were now working on rebuilding health and education services, new homes and even a local police force. During a press visit by The independent in August 2018, the city seems to be secured. Multiple checkpoints are present outside the city and weapons are not allowed to enter the city. Plans to reopen Mukalla international airport are also in place.

Climate

Economy 

The main market souq is one of the main commercial hubs of the city. Mukalla port is located to the east of the town. At the same time two vessels with the length  each and about 20 small fishing vessels can stay alongside in Mukalla port (fishing vessel moored alongside one to another). The port is fitted with oil pipe line for tankers. Oil tanks located close to the port. A cement factory of the "RAYSUT" Omeni-Yemeni company (Oman-Yemen company) located in the port and is able to receive cement in bulk from cement carriers.

Sights 
The old town is open for tourists. Sights include the royal palace of the sultan. Guard towers that were outposts surmount the vicinity of the old town. Nearby are Hadhramaut Mountains, such as that of Husn Ghuraf.

Education 
The HUCOM (College of Medicine) of the Hadhramout University is located in Mukalla.

References

External links 

Official Website of the Al-Quaiti Royal Family of Hadhramaut

 
Populated places in Hadhramaut Governorate
Gulf of Aden
Districts of Yemen
1035 establishments
Populated places established in the 11th century